Events in the year 2004 in Namibia.

Incumbents 

 President: Sam Nujoma
 Prime Minister: Theo-Ben Gurirab
 Chief Justice of Namibia: Johan Strydom (until September), Simpson Mtambanengwe (from October until November), Peter Shivute (from 1 December)

Events 

 15 & 16 November – General elections were held in the country to elect the President and National Assembly.

Deaths

References 

 
2000s in Namibia
Years of the 21st century in Namibia
Namibia
Namibia